Irena Trečiokaitė-Žebenkienė (28 October 1909, in Biržai – 13 January 1985, in Vilnius) was a Soviet and Lithuanian painter.

Biography 
In 1928, she finished high school. In 1928–1932, she studied law at Vytautas Magnus University. In 1935, she graduated from Kaunas Art School. In 1934, she joined the illegal Communist Party of Lithuania and was briefly jailed. In 1944, she graduated from Vilnius Academy of Arts.

Beginning in 1944, she taught at the Vilnius Institute of Fine Arts. In 1947, she became a docent. In 1948–1951, she was the head of the Drawing Department. In 1951–1969, she taught decorative painting in the Department of Painting.

In 1949, 1959, 1964 and 1979, she had solo exhibitions in Vilnius.

Awards
 1959: Honored Art Worker of the Lithuanian SSR
 1979: People's Artist of the Lithuanian SSR

Works 
 Portraits (Juozas Baltušis in 1949, Vincas Mickevičius-Kapsukas in 1955, Lėja Aleksandravičiūtė in 1959)
 Landscapes, historical compositions, created a mosaic (Lietuvaitė in 1946, Vladimir Lenin in 1965)
 Fresco, graphic works (Cars in 1934, Washing Floors in Prison, Hotel, Salome in 1934–1939, posters in 1940–1941, book illustrations, bookplates)

See also
List of Lithuanian artists

References

This article was initially translated from the Lithuanian Wikipedia.

1909 births
1985 deaths
20th-century Lithuanian painters
20th-century Lithuanian women artists
People from Biržai
Vytautas Magnus University alumni

Recipients of the Order of the Red Banner of Labour